Flies' graveyard and flies' cemetery are nicknames used in various parts of the United Kingdom for sweet pastries filled with currants or raisins, which are jokingly said to resemble dead flies. In Scotland, they are known as fly cakes, fruit slice or fruit squares and in Northern Ireland as currant squares. In the North East of England, the pastries are fly cakes or fly pie. In Wales it is called Cacen Pwdin ("dessert cake"); and in New Zealand they are known as fruit slice or fly cemetery.

The mixture is similar to sweet mince pies, which are traditionally eaten at Christmas time in the United Kingdom.

The Garibaldi biscuit, which contains a layer of squashed currants is commonly known as a "squashed fly" or "dead fly" biscuit in the UK.

See also
Eccles cake
Garibaldi biscuit
Gur cake
Pastry

References

External links
Fruit slice recipe

British desserts
British pastries
Fruit dishes
Scottish cuisine
New Zealand desserts
Winter traditions